Stockport Tiviot Dale was one of two main railway stations serving the town of Stockport, Cheshire, England; the other being Stockport Edgeley (now simply referred to as Stockport).

Tiviot Dale was named after Teviotdale in Scotland. Prince Charles Stuart camped to the north of the town in 1745.

Location and operating companies

Tiviot Dale station was located on the Cheshire Lines Committee (CLC) operated Stockport, Timperley and Altrincham Junction Railway line from Portwood to Skelton Junction, a section of what became the Woodley to Glazebrook line. It was situated at the bottom of Lancashire Hill, next to the present motorway bridge. It was opened on 1 December 1865  and was originally known as Stockport Teviot Dale.

Tiviot Dale remained a part of the CLC, which was jointly owned from 1923 by the London and North Eastern Railway (two-thirds) and the London Midland and Scottish Railway (one-third), until 1948 when it became part of the British Railways London Midland Region.

Station facilities and train services

The station buildings were substantially built.  The main building with booking hall, waiting rooms etc. was located on the south side of the line, approached from Tiviot Dale.  It had an ornate Jacobean-style external facade incorporating a long covered portico. There were four lines passing through the station; the central pair permitting goods and other trains to pass through without affecting trains stopping in the two main passenger platforms. There were shorter stub lines to the outer sides of the main platforms to accommodate local trains. A covered footbridge with an unusual arched profile linked the two sides of the station. Tiviot Dale signal box was located just west of the station on the south side of the lines.

A small two-line engine shed was located immediately to the north of the station between 1866 and 1889, with a turntable and six short storage lines. It closed on the opening of Heaton Mersey engine shed in early 1889.
Services from the station included routes to Manchester Central, Liverpool Central via Warrington Central,  via the Hope Valley line, Buxton and  via Millers Dale.

Station closure
The station was closed by British Railways on 2 January 1967, with most of its services having fallen victim to the Beeching Axe between 1964 and 1966. The station was demolished the following year. The lines through the station remained in heavy use by coal trains heading for Fiddlers Ferry power station near Warrington from the Woodhead Line. These, however, ceased in 1980  when damage was caused to the nearby Tiviot Dale tunnel during construction work on the M63 motorway (now M60 motorway) and the line temporarily closed for safety reasons.  The closure was made permanent west of Bredbury's stone terminal in 1982, following the demise of the Woodhead route; the track was subsequently lifted in 1986 and the tunnel partially filled in.  The area surrounding the station was further altered at the beginning of the 21st century to allow the construction of a supermarket and office buildings, which now block the old trackbed.

References
 Notes

Bibliography

External links

Stockport Tiviot Dale Station on navigable 1948 O.S. map
Stockport Tiviot Dale at Disused Stations Site Record

Disused railway stations in the Metropolitan Borough of Stockport
Former Cheshire Lines Committee stations
Railway stations in Great Britain opened in 1865
Railway stations in Great Britain closed in 1967
Beeching closures in England
Transport in Stockport